Chernushinsky District is an administrative district (raion) of Perm Krai, Russia; one of the thirty-three in the krai. Municipally, it is incorporated as Chernushinsky Municipal District. It is located in the south of the krai and borders with Uinsky District in the north, Oktyabrsky District in the east, the Republic of Bashkortostan in the south, Kuyedinsky District in the west, and with Bardymsky District in the northwest. Its administrative center is the town of Chernushka. Population:  The population of Chernushka accounts for 65.8% of the district's total population.

Geography
Geologically, it is located on the eastern outskirts of the East European craton. District's landscape is mostly flat with some hills. Major rivers include the Bystry Tanyp and the Tyuy. About 26% of the total district's territory is covered by forests.

Climate
The climate is temperate continental with relatively long and cold winters and warm summers.

History 
The district was established in 1925. In 1931, Ryabkovsky District was merged into it. In October 1938, the district became a part of Perm Oblast.

Demographics
Ethnic composition, according to the 2002 Census:
Russians: 77.4%
Tatars: 7.6%
Bashkirs: 6.6%
Udmurt people: 4.3%

There are also Chuvash people, Mari people and other ethnic minorities living in the district.

Economy
The economy of the district is based on oil industry, production of building materials, food industry, and agriculture.

There are several explored oil fields in the district, with the major one being the Pavlovskoye Field. There are also deposits of building materials in the district.

References

Notes

Sources

Districts of Perm Krai
States and territories established in 1925